This page details tank production by the United States of America during World War II.

Light tanks

Stuart series 
By the time the United States entered the Second World War in December 1941 it had only two tank designs ready for combat: the M1 Combat Car and the M2 Light Tank. Originally both tanks only came equipped with machine guns but in 1940, the M2A4 was upgraded to a 37mm anti-tank gun. The machine gun-armed tanks were never used in combat, and only a handful of cannon-armed vehicles saw service in the Pacific; but their design formed the basis of the later M3/M5 Light Tank. The British officially called their M3s Stuarts, and often referred to them as "Honeys".

Notes:
 M1 = M1 Combat Car, machine gun
 M2 = M2 Light Tank, 37 mm gun
 M3/M5 = M3 Light Tank, 37 mm gun
 M8 HMC = M8 Howitzer Motor Carriage, 75 mm M2 or M3 howitzer on M5 hull

Other light AFVs
The M22 Locust was specially designed to British requirements as an airmobile tank, to be delivered to the battlefield by glider. Production was delayed and by the time it entered service, it was considered obsolete.

The M24 Chaffee was intended as a replacement for the M3 and M5 series;

 Light Tank M22 Locust, 37 mm M6 gun
 Light Tank M24 Chaffee, 75 mm M6 gun
 M18 Gun Motor Carriage, also known as the Hellcat, was a tank destroyer armed with a 76 mm M1 gun

Medium tanks and AFVs
In 1939, the USA had manufactured 18 examples of the Medium M2 tank. This tank was never to see combat service, but its chassis and suspension were used as a basis for the Lee and Sherman tanks. Following the German invasion of France in 1940, a small number of Medium M2A1 tanks (an improved model) were manufactured for training. A better tank (which was eventually to become the Medium M3 Lee) was designed as an interim until the M4 could be produced. The M3 was ordered in large numbers by the British to a slightly different specification but by the time Lend-Lease was introduced the two variants were more alike except for the turret. Over half of M3 production would be supplied to the US's allies - the UK and USSR.

The Lee was superseded by the Medium M4 Sherman. This originally carried a 75 mm gun; later versions of the Sherman were armed with a 76 mm gun or a 105 mm howitzer.

On the Sherman hull, the M10 and M36 tank destroyers (officially called "Gun Motor Carriages") were produced.

The M7 Howitzer Motor Carriage was originally built on the M3 medium tank chassis, but later versions were built on the similar M4 tank chassis.

Notes:
 M2A1 = Medium M2A1
 M3 = Medium M3 Lee/Grant. The US version in British service was the Lee (named after General Lee); the British specification version (a different turret) was the Grant (named after General Grant).
 M4 = Medium M4 Sherman with 75 mm M3 (L/38) gun
 M4 (76) = Medium M4 Sherman with 76 mm M1-series gun
 M4 (105) = Medium M4 Sherman with 105 mm howitzer
 M10 GMC = M10 Gun Motor Carriage with 3" M7 gun
 M36 GMC = M36 Gun Motor Carriage with 90 mm M1 gun
 M7 HMC = M7 Howitzer Motor Carriage, M3 (Grant) or M4 (Sherman) hull with 105 mm howitzer in forward-facing mount.  Given the service name "Priest" by the British.
 M12 GMC = M12 Gun Motor Carriage, M3 (Grant) hull with 155 mm M1918 gun in forward-facing mount
 M30 Cargo Carrier, ammunition carrier for M12 GMC.

Heavy tanks
The Pershing heavy tank (named after General Pershing) was the only heavy tank used in combat by the US armed forces during World War II. An earlier design, the Heavy Tank M6, was not accepted for large scale production and only 40 were produced. Work began in early 1945 to develop a significantly heavier variant of the M26 Pershing, the T32 Heavy Tank, but after the end of the World War II, the project was cancelled and the four prototype vehicles were scrapped.

All types and derivatives

See also
 Other countries' production figures
 British armoured fighting vehicle production during World War II
 French armoured fighting vehicle production during World War II
 German armored fighting vehicle production during World War II
 Soviet armored fighting vehicle production during World War II

United States aircraft production during World War II

References

World War II armoured fighting vehicle production
Military history of the United States during World War II
United States Army in World War II